Zalman Gradowski or Chaim Zalman Gradowski (1910 – 7 October 1944) originally from Suwałki, was a Polish Jewish prisoner of the Auschwitz-Birkenau concentration camp during the Holocaust in occupied Poland. On November 2, 1942, he was deported, as were all Jews then living in Lunna, as well as neighboring towns, to the Kielbasin (Kolbasino) transit camp (Transitlager or Sammellager). On December 5, 1942, he and all his Jewish townsfolk (numbering approximately 1500) were forcibly marched from the Kielbasin transit camp to Lososno, Poland, where they boarded a train bound for, as he later discovered, Auschwitz. The train arrived in Auschwitz-Birkenau on the morning of December 8, 1942.  After "selection" at Auschwitz-Birkenau, his family members as well as all women and children, and most of the men who were on the transport, were immediately sent to the gas chamber and murdered. Shortly afterward, Gradowski and several others from the transport who survived the “selection” were sent to work in crematoria as part of the Sonderkommando slave labour unit.

Secret diary
In order to bear witness for future generations, Gradowski wrote a secret diary, in Yiddish, describing his life and the camp. He buried his notebook in the camp as a time capsule. In it, Gradowski provided a detailed description of the extermination process in Birkenau. He was one of the key figures in the Sonderkommando underground at Auschwitz, where he was murdered during the revolt of 7 October 1944.

A quotation from the diary is used as an epigram for the 2015 book KL: A History of the Nazi Concentration Camps: "May the world at least behold a drop, a fraction of this tragic world in which we lived." In another memorable passage, he wrote: "I pass on to you only a small part of what took place in the hell of Birkenau-Auschwitz. It is for you to comprehend the reality. I have written a great deal besides this. I am certain that you will come upon these remnants, and from them you will be able to construct a picture of how our people were killed...In this way I hope to immortalize the dear, beloved names of those for whom, at this moment, I cannot even expend a tear! For I live in an inferno of death, where it is impossible to measure my great losses.”

The introduction of the book is him immortalizing his family and his last wish for them to not be forgotten. His murdered family was: his mother (Sarah), sister (Libe), sister (Esther Rokhl), wife (Sonia), Father and brother in law (Raphael and Wolf). All named members of his family were gassed for being "unfit". His father, two brothers and another sister were also taken and he did not know what happened to them. He wrote of all of them in the introduction to his diary.

See also
 List of Holocaust diarists
 List of diarists
 List of posthumous publications of Holocaust victims

References

External links
 
 Horn, Dara, People Love Dead Jews. New York: W. W. Norton. (2021) . Chapter 1: Everyone's (Second) Favorite Dead Jew.

1910 births
1944 deaths
Polish people who died in Auschwitz concentration camp
Polish diarists
Polish Jews who died in the Holocaust
Jewish Polish writers
Holocaust diarists
Sonderkommando